Melissa L. Williams is an American actress and model, known for playing Denise and Ruth Truesdale in the BET prime time soap opera The Oval and its spinoff Ruthless.

Life and career
Williams was born in Oklahoma City, Oklahoma. She is the oldest of six children. Williams moved to Atlanta and attended Clark Atlanta University. She began her career appearing in several musicals at the local theater before moving to Los Angeles. On television, she guest starred on The Game, If Loving You Is Wrong and Rosewood. She received Indie Series Awards nomination for her performance in Poz Roz.

In 2019, Tyler Perry cast Williams in a dual role as twin sisters in his BET prime time soap opera The Oval. She later went to star in its spinoff Ruthless for streaming service BET+.

Filmography

Film

Television

Awards and nominations

References

External links 
 

African-American actresses
American television actresses
Living people
Clark Atlanta University alumni
Actresses from Oklahoma City
Year of birth missing (living people)
21st-century African-American people
21st-century African-American women